Neil Anthony Doyle (born 29 April 1978) is an Irish international referee who refereed at the 2014 & 2018 FIFA World Cup qualifiers. He refereed the 2012 FAI Cup Final & 2018 FAI Cup Final.

References

1978 births
Living people
Republic of Ireland football referees